SOZ may refer to:

 Solenzara Air Base, France (by IATA code)
 National Organization of Kurdish Youth
 Sistema Obespecheniya Zapuska, an auxiliary motor used in Soviet/Russian Rockets

See also
 Soz (disambiguation)